"Don't Rush" is a song by British rap duo Young T & Bugsey featuring British rapper Headie One. The track was released on 9 November 2019 as the second single from the duo's debut mixtape Plead the 5th (2020). The song was written by Young T & Bugsey and Headie One, and produced by Grades. The song was a commercial success, peaking within the top 20 of the UK Singles Chart, and received a nomination for the Brit Award for Song of the Year in 2021.

Music video
The music video premiered on YouTube on 7 November 2019. It was directed by KLVDR and produced by Pulse Films. As of March 2021, the video had surpassed 70 million views on YouTube.

Commercial performance
In June 2020, the track was certified as Gold by the British Phonographic Industry for exceeding chart sales of 400,000.

TikTok challenge
The "Don't Rush" challenge went viral on TikTok in April 2020, with over 79,000 videos created as of 16 April 2020. The challenge, also known as the #DontRushChallenge, involves people recording themselves in lounge attire, obscuring the screen (e.g., with a makeup brush), and then presenting themselves in a "going out" or "glammed up" attire. Since its creation, the challenge has evolved. Many people have begun creating their own takes on the challenge (e.g. using different music, highlighting their unique careers, or showcasing their culture) many celebrities, such as Marsai Martin, have joined in on the trend.

Remixes
On 29 May 2020, a remix featuring Latin-R&B and dancehall artist Rauw Alejandro was released. A second remix, featuring American rapper DaBaby, was released on 12 June 2020. On 3 July 2020, a third remix featuring American rapper Busta Rhymes was released. There is also a remix with Naika, who is most famous for Sauce.

Charts

Weekly charts

Year-end charts

Certifications

Release history

References

2019 singles
2019 songs
Young T & Bugsey songs
Headie One songs
Songs written by Headie One